Tatyanino is a rural locality (a village) in Slednevskoye Rural Settlement, Alexandrovsky District, Vladimir Oblast, Russia. The population was 95 in 2010. There are two streets.

Geography 
Grigorovo is the nearest rural locality.

References 

Rural localities in Alexandrovsky District, Vladimir Oblast